Phaea wappesi is a species of beetle in the family Cerambycidae. It was described by Chemsak in 1999. It is known to be from Mexico.

References

wappesi
Beetles described in 1999